Freeman Fisher "Gozzie" Gosden (May 5, 1899 – December 10, 1982) was an American radio comedian, actor and pioneer in the development of the situation comedy form.  He is best known for his work in the radio series Amos 'n' Andy.

Life and career
Gosden was born in Richmond, Virginia, the son of Emma L. (Smith) and Walter W. Gosden Sr. While attending school in Richmond, Gozzie worked part-time in Tarrant's Drug Store at 1 West Broad Street. During World War I, he served in the U.S. Navy as a wireless operator, which prompted his great interest in the young medium of radio. 

During 1921, Gosden first teamed with Charles Correll to do radio work, presenting comedy acts and hosting variety programs. They had met in Durham, North Carolina, both working for the Joe Bren Producing Company. Their first regular series bagan in 1925 with their WEBH Chicago program Correll and Gosden, the Life of the Party. For this program, the two told jokes, sang, and played music (Correll played piano and Gosden ukulele or banjo).

In 1926, Gosden and Correll had a success with their radio program Sam 'n' Henry broadcast by Chicago radio station WGN. Sam & Henry is considered by some historians to have been the first situation comedy. 

From 1928 to 1960, Gosden and Correll, who were white, broadcast their program Amos 'n' Andy, which was one of the most famous and popular radio series of the 1930s. Gosden voiced the characters "Amos", "George 'Kingfish' Stevens", "Lightning", "Brother Crawford", and some dozen other characters.

During 1961–1962, Gosden and Correll provided the voices for the animated television series Calvin and the Colonel broadcast by American Broadcasting Company-TV.

In 1969, Gosden was honored with a star on the Hollywood Walk of Fame for his work in radio. In 1974 Gosden was living in Palm Springs, California and was the best man for Frank Sinatra's 1976 wedding to Barbara Marx. In 1977, Gosden was inducted into the National Association of Broadcasters Hall of Fame along with Correll.

Personal life

Gosden was the father of four children: Virginia, Craig, Freeman Jr., and Linda.

Gosden was a charter member of the Augusta National Golf Club, joining the club at its inception in 1932.  He was a long-term good friend of Clifford Roberts, who, along with famed golfer Bob Jones, co-founded the club. He was a Freemason at Petersburg Lodge No. 15 in Virginia. 

Gosden died from congestive heart failure in Los Angeles, California on December 10, 1982, at the age of 83.

References

External links

1899 births
1982 deaths
20th-century American comedians
20th-century American male actors
American Freemasons
American male comedians
American radio personalities
American male radio actors
American male voice actors
Blackface minstrel performers
Comedians from California
Male actors from Richmond, Virginia
Male actors from Palm Springs, California
20th-century American male singers
20th-century American singers